Pellenes nigrociliatus is a jumping spider species in the genus Pellenes.

Taxonomy
Originally allocated to the genus Attus, the species was first identified by Eugène Simon in 1875 and published in a paper by Carl Ludwig Koch. It was given its current name in 1876.

Description
The spider is generally black with broad white stripes across the opisthosoma.

Distribution
The species has been found in an area that pans from the Canary Islands, through Turkey and Israel, across the Caucasus and Russia, to Central Asia and as far as China. The species is endemic across Europe, and has been identified in surveys across a wide range of countries including France, the Czech Republic and Poland.

Synonyms
In 1999, the species Pellenes tauricus (Thorelli, 1875) was moved from being a synonym with Pellenes simoni to be a junior synonym with Pellenes nigrociliatus. According to the World Spider Catalog, the species has also been described by the following species names:
 Attus bedeli Simon, 1875
 Attus nigrociliatus Simon, 1875
 Attus tauricus Thorell, 1875 (later moved to Pellenes)
 Calliethera unispina Franganillo, 1910
 Pellenes bedeli Simon, 1876
 Pellenes bilunulatus Simon, 1877
 Pellenes brassayi Herman, 1879
 Pellenes nigrociliatus bilunulatus Simon, 1937

Habits
The species nests and overwinters in snail shells, such as Xerolenta obvia, that they suspend from trees. The shells, which may weigh five or more times as much as the spider, are used to shelter from attacks by ants.

References

Arthropods of China
Arthropods of Israel
Arthropods of Russia
Arthropods of Turkey
Invertebrates of the Canary Islands
Spiders of Europe
Salticidae
Spiders of Asia
Taxa named by Eugène Simon
Spiders described in 1875